Euabalong West railway station is located on the Broken Hill line in New South Wales, Australia. It serves the town of Euabalong West.

History
Euabalong station opened on 10 February 1919 when the Broken Hill line was extended from Condobolin to Trida.

Services

Euabalong West is served by NSW TrainLink's weekly Outback Xplorer between Sydney and Broken Hill. It is also served by NSW TrainLink road coach services from Condobolin to Cootamundra.

Journey Beyond's weekly Indian Pacific passes Euabalong West but does not stop at the station.

References

Railway stations in Australia opened in 1919
Regional railway stations in New South Wales